The Society for College and University Planning (SCUP) is a professional association for the integration of planning in higher education institutions. It is headquartered in Ann Arbor, Michigan, and has 5,200 members in 33 countries.

External links 
 Official web site
 http://www.chemanet.org/members.asp
 
 https://www.facebook.com/SCUPers
 https://archive.today/20130710025649/http://www.universitybusiness.com/content/society-college-and-university-planning-scup

Professional associations based in the United States